Koh Hock Seng (born 26 May 1945) is a Malaysian field hockey player. He competed at the 1964 Summer Olympics and the 1968 Summer Olympics. He attended Malacca High School, where he played on the school's hockey team alongside  Yang Siow Ming.

References

External links
 

1945 births
Living people
Malaysian sportspeople of Chinese descent
Malaysian male field hockey players
Olympic field hockey players of Malaysia
Field hockey players at the 1964 Summer Olympics
Field hockey players at the 1968 Summer Olympics
Place of birth missing (living people)